Matchbox is a free and open source window manager for the X Window System. It is mainly intended for embedded systems and differs from most other window managers in that it only shows one window at a time. It is used by Maemo on Nokia Internet Tablets, the Neo 1973 smartphone based on Openmoko, the Vernier LabQuest handheld data acquisition device for science education, as well as on the XO-1 of the One Laptop Per Child Project. before being replaced by Metacity.

Matchbox 2 
Matchbox Window Manager II is a complete rewrite of the original m-w-m. It is in early stages of development.

See also 

 Comparison of window managers

References

External links 
 
 
 

Embedded operating systems
Free X window managers